The men's hammer throw was an event at the 1996 Summer Olympics in Atlanta, Georgia. There were 37 competitors from 22 nations, with twelve athletes reaching the final. The maximum number of athletes per nation had been set at 3 since the 1930 Olympic Congress. The eight highest-ranked competitors after three rounds qualified for the final three throws to decide the medals. The qualification mark was set at 76.50 metres. The event was won by Balázs Kiss of Hungary, the nation's first victory in the men's hammer throw since 1968 and fourth overall (third-most behind the United States's seven and the Soviet Union's six). Lance Deal earned the United States' first medal in the event since 1956 with his silver. Oleksandr Krykun's bronze gave Ukraine a medal in its debut as an independent nation.

Background

This was the 22nd appearance of the event, which has been held at every Summer Olympics except 1896. Seven of the 12 finalists from the 1992 Games returned: silver medalist Igor Astapkovich of the Unified Team (now competing for Belarus), fifth-place finisher (and 1980 and 1988 bronze medalist) Jüri Tamm of Estonia, sixth-place finisher (and 1988 finalist) Heinz Weis of Germany, seventh-place finisher Lance Deal of the United States, eighth-place finisher Sean Carlin of Australia, tenth-place finisher Christophe Epalle of France, and eleventh-place finisher Enrico Sgrulletti of Italy. Reigning Olympic champion and two-time reigning (1993 and 1995) world champion Andrey Abduvaliyev of Tajikistan did not compete. Astapkovich had been runner-up to Abduvaliyev at both world championships as well as the 1992 Games.

Belarus, the Czech Republic, Russia, Ukraine, and Uzbekistan each made their debut in the event. The United States appeared for the 21st time, most of any nation, having missed only the boycotted 1980 Games.

Competition format

The competition used the two-round format introduced in 1936, with the qualifying round completely separate from the divided final. In qualifying, each athlete received three attempts; those recording a mark of at least 76.50 metres advanced to the final. If fewer than 12 athletes achieved that distance, the top 12 would advance. The results of the qualifying round were then ignored. Finalists received three throws each, with the top eight competitors receiving an additional three attempts. The best distance among those six throws counted.

Records

Prior to the competition, the existing world and Olympic records were as follows.

No new world or Olympic records were set during the competition.

Schedule

All times are Eastern Daylight Time (UTC-4)

Results

Qualifying

Final

Deal and Sgrulletti were tied for 8th after three throws; rather than use the second-best-throw tie-breaker (which Sgrulletti would have won), the rules allowed both to continue with three additional throws. Deal took advantage with a strong final throw, nearly catching Kiss and earning the silver medal.

See also
 1996 Hammer Throw Year Ranking

References

External links
  Official Report
  Results
  hammerthrow.wz

H
Hammer throw at the Olympics
Men's events at the 1996 Summer Olympics